Mary Buchanan may refer to:
 Mary Beth Buchanan, American lawyer
 Mary Estill Buchanan, American politician in Colorado